Hawkinstown is an unincorporated community in Shenandoah County, in the U.S. state of Virginia.

References

Unincorporated communities in Virginia
Unincorporated communities in Shenandoah County, Virginia